PubGoa is an Indian Tamil-language virtual reality-based thriller web series that is streaming on ZEE5 platform from 27 November 2020. The 8-episodes web series is written and directed by Lakshmi Narayan Raju. It stars with Vimala Raman, Sampath Ram, Leo Sivadass, Ayra, Sarah Annaiah, Abishek Joseph George and Dev.

Synopsis 
PubGoa has two different stories running parallelly, one story is of a female police (Vimala Raman) who is investigating a violence and bloodshed shootout that happened at a new year's rave party which was held in Goa. And, second story is of a man who somehow escapes from the shootout alive and he is searching for his lost girlfriend.

Cast

Episodes list

Reception

Critical reception 
Pakaoo has given the web series 6/10 stars stating that "if you like the Sci-fi movies, can be watched once". Movie joins all the pieces together slowly and each character and situation reveal to the story. The narration gets little chaotic and predictable somewhere, call it as intended sometimes. Revealing or unfolding of the movie is very predictable at times, which is a weak point of movie. Connecting the subplots, investigation by cop, and suspense makes the movie watchable. Laxmi narayan direction is good and Cinematography by kartik thillai is good.

Binged Bureau of the Binged platform has given PubGoa a 5/10 stars rating stating that "One of the critical subplots is boringly executed for a long time. The other which is a proper thriller leads to a routine outcome". The other subplot throws a surprise and merging of both into a single incident is one of the best aspects of the series, story-wise. The web series is a passable thriller. The convoluted narrative and predictable end make it weaker. Give it a try if you love the genre and have lots of patience.

References

External links 
 PubGoa on ZEE5

ZEE5 original programming
Tamil-language web series
Tamil-language crime television series
Tamil-language thriller television series
2020 Tamil-language television series debuts
2020 Tamil-language television series endings